The Battle of Wiesloch occurred on 16 August 1632 during the Thirty Years' War near the German city of Wiesloch, south of Heidelberg.

A Swedish army led by Count Gustav Horn fought an army of the Holy Roman Empire led by Count Ernesto Montecuccoli.
The battle resulted in a Swedish victory.

Battles of the Thirty Years' War
Wiesloch (1632)
Battles in Baden-Württemberg
Conflicts in 1632
1632 in the Holy Roman Empire